"Remember (The First Time)" is the 1989 debut single by New Orleans-born singer Eric Gable.  The single was the most successful of Gable's eight singles on the Billboard R&B chart.  "Remember (The First Time)" went to number one for one week on the chart.

References

1989 debut singles
1989 songs